Eugenijus Levickas (Russian name: Еугениус Левицкас; born 5 April 1941) is a Soviet rower from Lithuania. He competed at the 1964 Summer Olympics in Tokyo with the men's coxed four where they came seventh.

References

1941 births
Living people
Soviet male rowers
Olympic rowers of the Soviet Union
Rowers at the 1964 Summer Olympics
Lithuanian male rowers